Diplacus clevelandii is an uncommon species of monkeyflower known by the common name Cleveland's bush monkeyflower. It was formerly known as Mimulus clevelandii.

Its specific epithet clevelandii honors 19th-century San Diego-based plant collector and lawyer Daniel Cleveland.

Distribution
It is endemic to the Peninsular Ranges of southern California and northern Baja California, where it grows in chaparral and oak woodland habitats, including in disturbed areas.

It is a Vulnerable species on the California Native Plant Society Inventory of Rare and Endangered Plants.

Description
Diplacus clevelandii is a sturdy perennial herb producing a hairy erect stem up to 90 centimeters tall from a woody caudex. The hairy lance-shaped or oblong leaves are up to 10 centimeters long and oppositely arranged, often with smaller leaves growing in their axils.

The tubular base of each flower is encapsulated in a hairy calyx of sepals over 2 centimeters long with long, pointed lobes. The flower corolla is bright yellow and up to 4 centimeters in length with a wide, five-lobed mouth.  Its bloom period is April to June.

References

External links
 Calflora Database: Mimulus clevelandii (Cleveland's bush monkeyflower)
Jepson Manual eFlora (TJM2) treatment of Mimulus clevelandii
UC CalPhotos gallery − Mimulus clevelandii

clevelandii
Flora of California
Flora of Baja California
Natural history of the California chaparral and woodlands
Natural history of the Peninsular Ranges
Flora without expected TNC conservation status